Vladimir Iselidze (born 25 November 1948) is a Soviet water polo player. He competed in the men's tournament at the 1976 Summer Olympics.

References

1948 births
Living people
Soviet male water polo players
Olympic water polo players of the Soviet Union
Water polo players at the 1976 Summer Olympics
Sportspeople from Tbilisi